The Susan Smith Blackburn Prize established in 1978, is the largest and oldest playwriting prize for women+ writing for English-speaking theatre.  Named for Susan Smith Blackburn (1935–1977), alumna of Smith College, who died of breast cancer.

Winners
 1978–79 Mary O'Malley  
 1979–80 Barbara Schneider, for Details Without a Map
 1980–81 Wendy Kesselman 
 1981–82 Nell Dunn
 1982–83 Marsha Norman 
 1983–84 Caryl Churchill 
 1984–86 Shirley Gee
 1986–86 Anne Devlin 
 1986–87 Mary Gallagher 
 1986–87 Ellen McLaughlin 
 1987–88 Caryl Churchill  
 1988–89 Wendy Wasserstein
 1989–90 Lucy Gannon
 1990–91 Rona Munro; Cheryl West 
 1991–92 Timberlake Wertenbaker
 1992–93 Marlane Meyer
 1993–94 Jane Coles
 1994–95 Susan Miller; Kristine Thatcher; Naomi Wallace 
 1995–96 Naomi Wallace
 1996–97 Marina Carr
 1997–98 Moira Buffini
 1997–98 Paula Vogel 
 1998–99 Jessica Goldberg 
 1999–00 Bridget Carpenter 
 2000–01 Charlotte Jones 
 2001–02 Gina Gionfriddo
 2001–02 Susan Miller 
 2002–03 Dael Orlandersmith 
 2003–04 Sarah Ruhl
 2004–05 Gurpreet Kaur Bhatti 
 2005–06 Amelia Bullmore for Mammals,  Elizabeth Kuti for The Sugar Wife
 2006–07 Lucy Caldwell for Leaves, Sheila Callaghan for Dead City, Stella Feehily for O Go My Man, Abbie Spallen for Pumpgirl
 2007–08 Judith Thompson for Palace of the End
 2008–09 Chloë Moss for This Wide Night
2009–2010 Julia Cho for The Language Archive
 2010–11 Katori Hall for Hurt Village 
 2011–12 Jennifer Haley for The Nether
 2012–13 Annie Baker for The Flick
 2013–14 Lucy Kirkwood for Chimerica
 2014–15 Tena Stivicic for Three Winters
 2015–16 Lynn Nottage for Sweat
 2016–17 Clare Barron for Dance Nation
 2017–18 Alice Birch for Anatomy of a Suicide
 2018–19 Jackie Sibblies Drury for Fairview
 2019–20 Lucy Prebble for A Very Expensive Poison
 2020-21 Erika Dickerson-Despenza for cullud wattah 
 2021-22 Benedict Lombe for Lava

Special Commendation
Judith Adams 1998–99†
Leslie Ayvazian 1995–96†
Lesley Bruce 1993–94†
Caryl Churchill 1982–83†
Migdalia Cruz 1990–91†
Joanna McClelland Glass 1980–81 †
Zinnie Harris  2000–01†
Beth Henley 1979–80†
Julie Hebert 1998–99†
Beth Henley 1979–80†
Naomi Iizuka  2000–01†
Julia Jordan  2001–02†
Elizabeth Kuti 1999-00†
Joanna Laurens 2000–01†
Bryony Lavery  2002–03†,
Lisa Loomer  1993–94†,
Sharman MacDonald 1984–85†,
Chloe Moss 2004–05†
Phyllis Nagy 1995–96†
Dael Orlandersmith 1999-00†
Winsome Pinnock  1989–90†
Jenny Schwartz 2007–08†
Lynn Siefert 1983–84†, 1991–92†
Timberlake Wertenbaker 1988–89†

Finalists

Judith Adams 1997–98, 1998–99†, 2000–01
Kay Adshead 1987–88, 2001–02, 2005–06
Rukhsana Ahmad 2001–02
Claudia Allen 2002–03
Hanan al-Shaykh 1996–97
Jane Anderson 1990–91, 1991–92, 1992–93†
Leslie Ayvazian 1995–96†, 2004–05
Nicola Baldwin  1993–94, 1999–00
Clare Barron 2014–15
Lynda Barry  1991–92
Neena Beber 2003–04
Hilary Bell 1998–99
Jean Betts 2003–04
Gurpreet Kaur Bhatti 2004–05*
Alice Birch 2014–15
Caroline Bird 2013–14
Alecky Blythe 2014–15
Clara Brennan 2014–15
Linda Brogan 2007–08
Tina Brown  1978–79
Lesley Bruce 1993–94†
Moira Buffini  1992–93, 1997–98*
Katherine Burger 1996–97
Mary Elizabeth Burke-Kennedy 1984–85
Kathleen Cahill  1984–85
Lucy Caldwell 2006–07
Sheila Callaghan 2006–07
Jo Carson 1989–90
Katherine Chandler 2014–15
 Anupama Chandrasekhar 2008–09
Julia Cho  2001–02, 2006–07
Caryl Churchill  1979–80, 1982–83†, 1983–84*, 1987–88*
Paula Cizmar  1981–82†, 1982–83
Kathleen Clark 1987–88
Pearl Cleage 1983–84, 1993–94, 1995–96
Sara Clifford 1998–99
Lin Coghlan 2003–04
Kathleen Collins 1982–83, 1986–87
Sherry Coman 1990–91
Anne Commire  1988–89
Constance Congdon 1985–86, 1995–96
Trista Conger  1988–89
Helen Cooper 1984–85, 1986–87, 2002–03
Kia Corthron  1997–98
Frances Ya-Chu Cowhig 2014–15
Migdalia Cruz 1990–91†, 1996–97
Alexandra Cunningham 2000–01
Leigh Curran  1978–79
Barbara Damashek 1987–88
Lisa D'Amour 2014–2015
April De Angelis 2005–06
Donna de Matteo  1982–83
Christian de Lancie 1993–94
Ruby Dee  1993–94
Dolly Dhingra 1999-00
Lydia Diamond 2007–08
Ann Marie Di Mambro 1994–95
Elizabeth Diggs  1981–82, 1987–88†
Nancy Donohue  1979–80
Katie Douglas 2006–07
Bathsheba Doran  2005–06
Rosalyn Drexler 1983–84
Carol Ann Duffy  1982–83
Susan Dworkin 1980–81
Helen Edmundson 1993–94
Margaret Edson 1993–94
Elizabeth Egloff 1995–96, 1996–97
Charlotte Eilenberg 2002–03
Eve Ensler 1998–99, 2000–01
Nancy Ewing  2000–01
Stella Feehily  2006–07
Lindsey Ferrentino 2014–15
Barbara Field  1982–83, 1988–89
Susan Flakes 1996–97
Kate Fodor 2002–03
Maria Irene Fornes 1985–86, 1987–88
Amy Fox 2006–07
Donna Franceschild 1989–90
J.E. Franklin  1981–82, 1989–90, 1992–93
Amy Freed 1993–94, 2001–02
Mary Gallagher 1979–80, 1986–87*, 1989–90
Lucy Gannon 1988–89, 1989–90*
Lillian Garrett 1989–90
Nancy Fales Garrett 1982–83
Judy GeBauer 1987–88
Shirley Gee 1983–84, 1984–85*, 1989–90
Pam Gems 1978–79, 1985–86, 1996–97†
Alexandra Gersten 2002–03
Melissa James Gibson 2005–06
Rebecca Gilman 1998–99, 1999–00, 2004–05
Joanna McClelland Glass  1978–79, 1980–81 †, 1983–84, 2004–05
Sue Glover 1991–92
Debbie Tucker Green 2002–03, 2005–06
Linda Marshall Griffiths 2005–06
Rinne Groff 2002–03
Nikki Harmon  1988–89
Zinnie Harris  2000–01†, 2003–04
Valerie Harris  1978–79
Catherine Hayes 1981–82
Beth Henley 1979–80†, 1987–88, 2005–06
Jacqueline Holborough  1987–88
Endesha Ida Mae Holland  1992–93
Debbie Horsfield 1984–85
Velina Hasu Houston  1985–86
Tina Howe  1979–80, 1983–84, 1997–98
Noelle Janaczewska 1997–98
Lenka Janiurek  1978–79
Ann Jellicoe  1980–81
Catherine Johnson 1991–92
Cindy Lou Johnson 1984–85, 1986–87
Jennifer Johnston  1996–97
Marie Jones 1999-00
Julia Jordan  1996–97, 2001–02†, 2006–07
Yazmine Judd  1998–99
C. Michèle Kaplan 2006–07
Shirley Kaplan 1981–82
Julia Kearsley  1980–81, 1982–83
Margaret Keilstrup 1981–82
Adrienne Kennedy  1990–91
Wendy Kesselman  1980–81*, 1989–90
Carson Kreitzer 2003–04
Gail Kriegel 1983–84
Casey Kurtti 1987–88 
Oni Faida Lampley 2005–06
Mary Lathrop 1991–92
Shirley Lauro  1980–81, 1991–92
Bryony Lavery  1980–81, 2002–03†, 2004–05, 2007–08
Maureen Lawrence 1990–91, 1994–95
Barbara Lebow  1985–86, 1994–95, 1995–96, 1997–98
Young Jean Lee 2009–10
Rebecca Lenkiewicz 2004–05
Nell Leyshon 2006–07
Liz Lochhead 1998–99
Rosie Logan 1986–87
Lisa Loomer  1993–94†, 2003–04
Claire Luckham 1991–92
Anne Ludlum 2002–03
Sharman MacDonald  1984–85†, 1990–91, 1995–96
Carol Mack 1982–83
Emily Mann 1981–82, 1984–85, 1996–97, 1999–00
Melanie Marnich  2004–05
Nicola McCartney  1997–98
Mia McCullough 2004–05
Heather McDonald 2002–03
Lisa McGee 2007–08†
Anne McGravie 1984–85
Grace McKeaney 1981–82
Ellen McLaughlin 1986–87*, 1989–90
Linda McLean 2007–08
Jenny McLeod 1999-00
Clare Mclntyre 1992–93
Cassandra Medley 1988–89
Susan Miller  1979–80, 1988–89, 1994–95§, 2001–02*
Lois Meredith 1993–94
Marlane Meyer 1986–87, 1988–89, 1989–90, 1992–93*
Ann Mitchell 1981–82
Abi Morgan 2003–04
Lavonne Mueller 1980–81, 1986–87
Philomena Muinzer 1979–80
Melissa Murray 1985–86, 1986–87
Julie Marie Myatt  2007–08
Sally Nemeth 1994–95
Ann Noble 2003–04
Marsha Norman 1978–79†, 1982–83*, 1983–84
Lynn Nottage 1997–98
Zodwa Nyoni 2014–15
Meredith Oakes 2000–01
Kira Obolensky 1998–99, 2005–06
Edna O'Brien 1979–80
Tamsin Oglesby  1995–96, 2006–07
Mary O'Malley  1978–79*, 1985–86†
Louise Page  1982-83, 1984–85
Suzan-Lori Parks  1996–97, 1999–00
Sybille Pearson 1980–81
Carey Perloff 2001–02
Winsome Pinnock  1989–90†, 1991–92
Lucy Prebble 2003–04
Nu Quang  1992–93
Heather Raffo 2004–05†
Aishah Rahman 1985–86
Theresa Rebeck 1994–95, 2002–03
Christina Reid 1984–85
Jacquelyn Reingold 1994–95
Anna Reynolds 1992–93
Gillian Richmond 1990–91
Susan Rivers 1984–85
Kate Moira Ryan 1996–97
Milcha Sanchez-Scott 1986–87
Barbara Schneider 1979–80*, 1980–81
Julia Schofield 1987–88
Heidi Schreck 2014–15
Rose Scollard 1995–96
Adele Edling Shank 1981–82, 1982–83 
Anna Deavere Smith 1992–93, 1993–94
Diana Son 1998–99
Susan Sontag 1992–93
Abbie Spallen  2006–07
Ruby Rae Spiegel 2014–15
Shelagh Stephenson  1997–98†
Polly Stenham 2007–08
Victoria Stewart 2007–08
Tena Stivicic 2014–15
Kelly Stuart 2001–02
Karen Duke Sturges 1979–80
Elizabeth Swados 1991–92
Polly Teale 2003–04
Kristine Thatcher 1985–86, 1994–95§
Freyda Thomas 1999-00
Judith Thompson 2002–03, 2007–08*
Katherine Thomson 2004–05
Jane Thornton 1985–86
Leonora Thuna 1986–87†
Susan Todd 1981–82
Kathleen Tolan  1997–98
Kay Trainor 1992–93
Paula Vogel 1991–92, 1992–93, 1994–95, 1995–96
Francine Volpe 2006–07
Terri Wagener 1978–79, 1983–84
Celeste Bedford Walker 1999-00
Wendy Wasserstein 1978–79, 1981–82, 1992–93
Alison Watson 1980–81
Annie Weisman 2000–01
Patricia Wettig 2004–05
Erin Cressida Wilson 1995–96
Tracey Scott Wilson 2001–02
Victoria Wood 1979–80
Sarah Woods 2000–01
Elizabeth Wyatt 1988–89
Olwen Wymark 1978–79, 1979–80
Sheila Yeger 1988–89, 1990–91
Shay Youngblood 1989–90
Karen Zacarias 2003–04

See also

 List of literary awards honoring women

References

External links 
The Susan Smith Blackburn Prize

Dramatist and playwright awards
Literary awards honoring women
Awards established in 1978
1978 establishments in the United States